Four Times Love ( [in Sweden];  [in Finland]; ;) is a 1951 co-Nordic film directed by Hampe Faustman and Johan Jacobsen and starring Sonja Wigert.

Cast
 Sonja Wigert as Nina Lind
 Georg Funkquist as Mayor
 Bengt Logardt as First Aide
 Börje Mellvig as Second Aide
 Gyrd Løfquist as Third Aide
 Sture Lagerwall as Gustaf Dalander
 William Markus as Toivo Nurminen
 Poul Reichhardt as Axel Poulsen
 Georg Richter as Finn Borg
 Bengt Blomgren as Sigurd Thorarinsen

References

External links

1951 films
1950s multilingual films
1950s Swedish-language films
1950s Finnish-language films
Finnish black-and-white films
Swedish black-and-white films
Finnish multilingual films
Swedish multilingual films
Danish multilingual films
Norwegian multilingual films
Films directed by Hampe Faustman
Danish black-and-white films
Norwegian black-and-white films
1950s Swedish films